The Wonderful Lies of Nina Petrovna (German: Die wunderbare Lüge der Nina Petrowna) is a 1929 German silent drama film directed by Hanns Schwarz and starring Brigitte Helm, Francis Lederer and Warwick Ward. It was the last big-budget silent film released by the leading German studio Universum Film AG before the transition to sound began with Melody of the Heart. The film premiered on 15 April 1929 at the Ufa-Palast am Zoo in Berlin. It was amongst the most popular films released in Germany that year.

It was remade in France in 1937 as The Lie of Nina Petrovna.

Synopsis
Michael Rostof, a young officer serving in the Tsar's army in pre-1914 St. Petersburg, strikes up a deep emotional bond with Nina Petrovna. Only later does he discover she is the kept mistress of the influential Colonel Beranoff. She chooses to give up the luxurious existence that Beranoff offers her, in order to live with the much poorer Rostof. Although they can not even pay their electricity bills on time they are both incredibly happy.

Beranoff is enraged by his lover's decision to spurn him and he plots his revenge. One night in the officer's mess he traps Rostof into cheating at cards. When Rostof is confronted, he resolves to take the honourable way out. When Petrovna is informed, in order to save her lover's career and life, she agrees to abandon Rostof and go back to Beranoff. The Colonel in turn agrees to destroy the incriminating evidence. To hide the real reason from him, Petrovna pretends to abandon Rostof because he cannot afford to supply her with expensive clothes and jewels, sneering at his well meaning gift of some shoes. Rostof is left heartbroken, while Petrovna is secretly anguished.

At the end of the film, as his regiment rides out of St. Petersburg, Rostof symbolically ignores a rose thrown to him from her balcony by Petrovna. Shortly afterwards when Beranoff arrives to call on Petrovna in expectation of resuming their relationship, he discovers she has killed herself- wearing the shoes Rostof brought her.

Cast
 Brigitte Helm as Nina Petrovna 
 Francis Lederer as Lt. Michael Rostof 
 Warwick Ward as Col. Beranoff 
 Lya Jan as Bauernmädchen 
 Harry Hardt   
 Ekkehard Arendt   
 Michael von Newlinsky   
 Franz Schafheitlin

References

Bibliography
 Bergfelder, Tim & Bock, Hans-Michael. The Concise Cinegraph: Encyclopedia of German. Berghahn Books, 2009.
 Hardt, Ursula. From Caligari to California: Erich Pommer's Life in the International Film Wars. Berghahn Books, 1996.
 Prawer, S.S. Between Two Worlds: The Jewish Presence In German And Austrian Film, 1910-1933. Berghahn Books, 2005.

External links

1929 films
1929 drama films
German drama films
Films of the Weimar Republic
German silent feature films
Films directed by Hanns Schwarz
Films set in Saint Petersburg
Films set in the 1910s
Films produced by Erich Pommer
Films with screenplays by Hans Székely
German black-and-white films
UFA GmbH films
Silent drama films
1920s German films
1920s German-language films